The Essex-class ships of the line were a class of two 64-gun third rates, designed for the Royal Navy by Sir Thomas Slade.

Ships

Builder: Wells and Stanton, Rotherhithe
Ordered: 31 January 1759
Launched: 28 August 1760
Fate: Sold out of the service, 1799

Builder: Perry, Blackwall Yard
Ordered: 31 January 1759
Launched: 1 August 1761
Fate: Sold out of the service, 1774

References
Lavery, Brian (2003) The Ship of the Line - Volume 1: The development of the battlefleet 1650-1850. Conway Maritime Press. .

 
Ship of the line classes
Ships built by the Blackwall Yard